Suzanne Bachelard (October 18, 1919, Voigny – November 3, 2007, Paris) was a French philosopher and academic. In 1958, she published La Conscience de la rationalité. She was the daughter of philosopher Gaston Bachelard whose posthumous book Fragments d'une Poétique du Feu she edited. She taught at the Sorbonne, where she also had Jacques Derrida as her assistant.
She was the first translator to French of Edmund Husserl Formal and Transcendental Logic.

See also
Charles de Gaulle University – Lille III
Epistemological psychology

Notes

References
Geoffrey Bennington (1991) Jacques Derrida, University of Chicago Press. Section Curriculum vitae pp. 325–36, Excerpts

1919 births
2007 deaths
French women academics
French women philosophers
German–French translators
20th-century French philosophers
20th-century French women writers
Officiers of the Légion d'honneur
20th-century French translators